Leucophlebia rosacea is a moth of the family Sphingidae. It is known from India.

References

Leucophlebia
Moths described in 1875